Jørpeland is the administrative centre of Strand municipality in Rogaland county, Norway. It sits along the Norwegian National Road 13 a short distance southeast of the village of Tau where the Ryfast tunnel has its eastern entrance. The name "Jørpeland" is composed of the slightly changed Old Norse word "jarpr", which translates to brown, and the word land ("brownland"). The reason for this name is that historically, the river Jørpelandsånå used to turn brown during times of flood.

Jørpeland is also known as "Pulpit Rock City", because Jørpeland is nearest city to the Preikestolen, which attracts tourists from all over the world.

Jørpeland became designated as a town by the municipal council on 1 April 1998.  Prior to that time it was simply considered a very large village. Jørpeland is divided into nine boroughs: Leite, Barka, Tungland, Barkved, Jøssang, Førland, Langeland, Grønnevoll, and Fjelde.  The river Jørpelandsåna runs through the town before emptying into the fjord on the south side of the town.

Attractions 

Jørpelands Brug is a building from 1883, which is located at Vågen in Jørpeland. Jørpeland also has tourist information, liquor store, a cultural center (Torghuset), a harbor in Vågen with boardwalk, various restaurants and grocery stores. Jørpeland also has a golf course just outside the city, as well some campsites.  The Jørpeland Church was built in 1969 to serve the town.

The town also has some good beaches for swimming and sport activities. Most notably are Barkavika and Nordlys. Barkavika has its own two Volleyball courts, while Nordlys has a playground right next to the beach.

Jørpeland has an annual tradition festival, called Strandadagene, arranged first weekend of June.

Geography
The town of Jørpeland is in a very mountainous area.  It is surrounded by many mountains including:
 Preikestolen
 Heiahornet
 Hamrane
 Langaberg
 Gramsfjellet
 Krokarfjellet
 Førlandsåsen
 Tunglandsfjellet
 Barkafjellet
 Øykjafjellet

Notable residents
 Espen Fiveland (1974–), journalist
 Jon Gjedebo (1945–), inventor and businessman
 Stian Heimlund Skjæveland (1973–), figurative painter and draftsman
 Trygve Holst (1907–1945), advertising manager and resistance
 Tony Knapp (1936–), former footballer and manager
 Johnny Lodden (1985–), Poker player
 Helge Steinsvåg (1970–), ex-mayor of Jørpeland
 Silje Vige (1976–), singer
 Hugo Mikal Skår (1978–), actor

See also
List of towns and cities in Norway

References

Strand, Norway
Cities and towns in Norway
Populated places in Rogaland
1998 establishments in Norway